Rhochmopterum munroi is a species of tephritid or fruit flies in the genus Rhochmopterum of the family Tephritidae.

Distribution
Malawi, Zimbabwe, South Africa.

References

Tephritinae
Insects described in 1924
Taxa named by Mario Bezzi
Diptera of Africa